Verkhnyaya Dobrinka is a rural locality (a selo) and the administrative center of Verkhnedobrinskoye Rural Settlement, Kamyshinsky District, Volgograd Oblast, Russia. The population was 1,261 as of 2010. There are 14 streets.

Geography 
Verkhnyaya Dobrinka is located in forest steppe, on the Volga Upland, 41 km northeast of Kamyshin (the district's administrative centre) by road. Nizhnyaya Dobrinka is the nearest rural locality.

References 

Rural localities in Kamyshinsky District